The Readington Reformed Church is a historic church located at 124 Readington Road, Readington Village, an unincorporated community located within Readington Township in Hunterdon County, New Jersey. It was known in colonial times as the Dutch Reformed Church of North Branch. It is the oldest Dutch Reformed Church in the county. The current building was built in 1865. The churchyard is known as the Readington Reformed Church Cemetery. The church was added as a contributing property of the Readington Village Historic District by the National Register of Historic Places on June 24, 1991.

History
The first church was organized in 1719 by a local congregation of the Dutch Reformed Church. They constructed a log church located near the confluence of the North Branch and South Branch into the Raritan River, about three miles east of Readington, in what is now Branchburg in neighboring Somerset County. On February 21, 1720, Reverend Theodorus Jacobus Frelinghuysen preached the first sermon there.

In 1738, the congregation left its original site and built its second church, a new frame building in Readington.

Frelinghuysen was pastor until 1748 and was succeeded by his son, Reverend John Frelinghuysen.

The Reverend Johannes Arondeus served as Conferentie, the pastor of the Classis ( orthodox ) Church of Amsterdam, at Readington Reformed Church from 1747 to 1754.

The Reverend Jacob Rutsen Hardenbergh, later the first President of Queens College (now Rutgers University), was ordained in 1757 and served the congregation for twenty five years.

The Reverend Peter Studdiford served from 1787 until 1826. In 1825, the congregation was large enough to form a new church at North Branch village.

Two church buildings were constructed during the pastorate of Reverend John Van Liew, who served over forty years, from 1828 until his death in 1869. The first was a new church dedicated on December 22, 1833, which burned down on March 22, 1864. The second was the construction of the current building, dedicated on July 20, 1865.

The tall church steeple was blown over by a cyclone on January 3, 1913 and replaced by shorter version. After a restoration project one hundred years later, a new steeple was dedicated on October 27, 2013.

Notable burials
 Peter Studdiford ( – ), pastor, Readington Reformed Church and Bedminster Reformed Church
 John Van Liew ( –  ), pastor, Readington Reformed Church

See also
North Branch Reformed Church
Readington Village Historic District

References

Bibliography

External links

Readington Township, New Jersey
Reformed Church in America churches in New Jersey
Churches in Hunterdon County, New Jersey
Cemeteries in Hunterdon County, New Jersey
Historic district contributing properties in New Jersey
National Register of Historic Places in Hunterdon County, New Jersey
1719 establishments in New Jersey
19th-century Reformed Church in America church buildings
Religious organizations established in 1719
Churches on the National Register of Historic Places in New Jersey